Shangani District is a district in the southeastern Banaadir region of Somalia. It lies in central Mogadishu. Shingani along with Hamar Weyne are the oldest districts in Mogadishu. Shangani means On the sand in  Swahili, as this district was originally a Benadir settlement.

Mosques 
Despite being the smallest districts in Mogadishu, the Shingani along with its neighbouring district Hamar Weyne are known for their many mosques and madrasahs. There are over 15 mosques in this district, which include:

 Arba'a Rukun
 Aw Kampay 
 Aw Mojow 
 Aw Muqfi 
 Aw Faraj Bin 'Ali 
 Awo Sharif 'Ali 
 Jaama' Shingani (Friday mosque) 
 Ma‟la 
 Rowda 
Sheikh Ahmed Sharif
 Sheikh Mohamed 'Abdisamad 
 Sheikh Omar & Sheikh Nureini (Twin mosques) 
 Sheikh Said Bin Isse
 Wafle

References

Districts of Somalia
Administrative map of Shangani District

Districts of Somalia
Banaadir